Maryland House of Delegates District 29B is one of the 67 districts that compose the Maryland House of Delegates. Along with subdistricts 29A and 29C, it makes up the 29th district of the Maryland Senate. District 29B includes part of St. Mary's County, and is represented by one delegate.

Demographic characteristics
As of the 2020 United States census, the district had a population of 44,620, of whom 34,184 (76.6%) were of voting age. The racial makeup of the district was 25,721 (57.6%) White, 10,841 (24.3%) African American, 193 (0.4%) Native American, 1,878 (4.2%) Asian, 32 (0.1%) Pacific Islander, 1,502 (3.4%) from some other race, and 4,429 (9.9%) from two or more races. Hispanic or Latino of any race were 3,936 (8.8%) of the population.

The district had 26,285 registered voters as of October 17, 2020, of whom 5,785 (22.0%) were registered as unaffiliated, 8,554 (32.5%) were registered as Republicans, 11,468 (43.6%) were registered as Democrats, and 265 (1.0%) were registered to other parties.

Past Election Results

1990

1994

1998

2002

2006

2010

2014

2018

List of delegates

References

29B